The Golden Trail is an American silent drama film released in 1920. Directed by Jean Hersholt and Lewis H. Moomaw, the script was written by Elizabeth Mahoney.

Plot 
Jane Novak starred in two roles within the film: first as "Faro," queen of an Alaskan gambling hall, and second as Jane Sunderlin, a college co-ed, beloved mascot of her college's football team.

Starring 

 Jane Novak as "Faro" Kate / Jane Sunderlin
 Jack Livingston as Dave Langdon
 Jean Hersholt as Harry Teal
 Bert Sprotte as Jim Sykes
 Otto Matieson as Dick Sunderlin
 Al Ernest Garcia as Jean the Half-Breed
 Broderick O'Farrell as Bill Lee

Production 
The film—set primarily in Alaska—was produced by the American Lifeograph Company, an independent outfit based in Portland, Oregon (where the film was shot).

References 

Films set in Alaska
American silent feature films
Films shot in Portland, Oregon
1920s American films
Silent American drama films